Idioneurula is a genus of butterflies in the family Nymphalidae. The species of this genus are found in the Neotropics.

Species
Idioneurula donegani Huertas & Arias, 2007
Idioneurula erebioides (C.Felder & R.Felder, 1867)
Idioneurula eremita Viloria & Pyrcz, 2007
Idioneurula jacquelinae Pyrcz, 1995
Idioneurula socorroi Villalobos-Moreno & Salazar, 2013

Taxonomy
The type species (through Article 67.8 (replacement names)) is Idioneura erebioides C. Felder and R Felder, 1867.

References

 , 2007, Zootaxa 1652: 27-40 
 , 2007, Tropical Lepidoptera 15 (1-2) 

Satyrini
Butterfly genera
Taxa named by Embrik Strand